Jason Devon McCourty (born August 13, 1987) is a former American football cornerback who played 13 seasons in the National Football League (NFL). Drafted by the Tennessee Titans in the sixth round, 203rd overall, in the 2009 NFL Draft, he also played for the Cleveland Browns, the New England Patriots, and the Miami Dolphins.   In a rare feat, McCourty went from playing for an 0-16 team one year (the 2017 Browns), to winning a Super Bowl the following season (LIII with the 2018 Patriots).

He played college football at Rutgers. He primarily played cornerback throughout his first eleven NFL seasons, but became the starting free safety for the Miami Dolphins in 2021.

In 2022 McCourty was hired by NFL Network to serve as an analyst on Good Morning Football, and by Westwood One to help call select Thursday Night Football radio broadcasts.

College career
Jason McCourty started 3 years as a cornerback for Rutgers University. He ended his college career with 148 tackles, 2 interceptions, 20 pass breakups and finished second in the Big East in kickoff returns as a senior. His twin brother, Devin, started alongside him as a cornerback at Rutgers. McCourty graduated with a bachelor's degree in information technology.

Professional career
Coming out of Rutgers, McCourty was not a highly sought after prospect and did not receive an invitation to the NFL Combine. On March 23, 2009, he participated at Rutgers' pro day, along with Kenny Britt, Mike Teel, Tiquan Underwood, Courtney Greene, Kevin Brock, Kevin Malast, and nine other teammates. 41 team representatives and scouts from 27 NFL teams attended Rutgers pro day to scout one of the most talented teams in school history. McCourty ran the fastest time of any player there in the 40-yard dash.

Tennessee Titans
The Tennessee Titans selected McCourty in the sixth round (203rd overall) of the 2009 NFL Draft. He was the second player from Rutgers that the Tennessee Titans drafted after first-rounder Kenny Britt and was the 31st cornerback that was drafted in 2009 draft.

2009
On June 23, 2009, the Tennessee Titans signed McCourty to a four-year, $1.84 million contract.

Throughout training camp, he competed for the fifth cornerback spot on the roster against rookie Ryan Mouton, DeMarcus Faggins, Tanard Davis, and Jeremy Haynes. Head coach Jeff Fisher named McCourty the fourth cornerback on the Titans' depth chart to start the regular season, behind Cortland Finnegan, Nick Harper, and Cary Williams.

He made his professional regular season debut in the Tennessee Titans' season-opening 13–10 loss at the Pittsburgh Steelers. In Week 3, he made his first career tackle and finished the Titans' 24–27 loss at the New York Jets with three solo tackles. On October 4, 2009, McCourty earned his first career start in place of Cortland Finnegan, who suffered a hamstring injury the previous week. McCourty finished the 37–17 loss at the Jacksonville Jaguars with four solo tackles. The following week, he started his second consecutive game in the absence of Finnegan and recorded a season-high eight combined tackles during their 31–9 loss against the Indianapolis Colts. During Week 8, McCourty was surpassed on the depth chart by newly acquired free agent Roderick Hood. He also missed the Titans' Week 10 victory against the Buffalo Bills due to an injury.

2010
McCourty entered training camp competing for the job as the starting cornerback against Ryan Mouton, rookie Alterraun Verner, and Tye Hill after the role was left vacant by the departure of Nick Harper during the off-season. Head coach Jeff Fisher named McCourty the starting cornerback, alongside Cortland Finnegan, to start the regular season.

He started the Tennessee Titans' season-opener against the Oakland Raiders and recorded a season-high eight combined tackles and a pass deflection in their 38–13 victory. On September 26, 2010, he collected four combined tackles, broke up a pass, and intercepted a pass by Eli Manning in the endzone before leaving the Titans' 29–10 victory at the New York Giants with an arm injury. It was later reported that McCourty had suffered a broken right forearm and would have to undergo surgery. On September 28, 2010, McCourty underwent surgery and missed the next four games (Weeks 4–7). Upon his return in Week 8, he was relegated to being the third cornerback behind Finnegan and Verner for the rest of the season. On October 31, 2010, McCourty made three solo tackles, a pass deflection, and intercepted a pass by Philip Rivers during their 33–25 loss at the San Diego Chargers. He finished the season with 47 combined tackles (37 solo), ten pass deflections, and two interceptions in 12 games and six starts.

2011
On January 28, 2011, the Tennessee Titans announced the firing of head coach Jeff Fisher after a six-year tenure and a disappointing 6-10 season in 2010. Throughout training camp, McCourty competed against Alterraun Verner for the role as the starting cornerback. Head coach Mike Munchak named McCourty the starting cornerback, opposite Cortland Finnegan, to begin the 2011 regular season.

In Week 2, McCourty collected four solo tackles, broke up a pass, an interception, and made his first career sack on Baltimore Ravens' quarterback Joe Flacco during their 26–13 victory. On October 9, 2011, he made a season-high 14 combined tackles (eight solo) and deflected a pass in a 38-17 loss at the Pittsburgh Steelers. McCourty was sidelined for the Titans' Week 14 loss to the New Orleans Saints due to a concussion he suffered the previous week against the Buffalo Bills. He finished the season with a career-high 103 combined tackles (83 solo, 13 pass deflections), two interceptions, a sack, and a forced fumble in 15 games and 15 starts.

2012
On August 23, 2012, the Tennessee Titans signed McCourty to a six-year, $43 million contract extension that includes $20 million guaranteed and a signing bonus of $9 million.

McCourty and Verner entered the regular season as the starting cornerback duo after Cortland Finnegan departed to the St. Louis Rams in free agency. In Week 5, McCourty recorded a season-high nine combined tackles and deflected a pass during a 30–7 loss at the Minnesota Vikings. On November 11, 2012, he collected a season-high nine solo tackles and deflected a pass as the Titans' routed the Miami Dolphins 37–3. On December 17, 2012, he made five combined tackles, two pass deflections, and intercepted quarterback Mark Sanchez twice during a 14–10 victory against the New York Jets. McCourty finished the  season with 92 combined tackles (73 solo), a career-high 15 pass deflections, and four interceptions in 16 games and 16 starts.

2013
McCourty and Verner remained the starting cornerbacks to start the 2013 season. In Week 6, McCourty made a season-high nine combined tackles and forced a fumble as the Titans lost 20-13 at the Seattle Seahawks. He finished the  season with 65 combined tackles (54 solo) and 11 pass deflections in 16 games and 16 starts. The Tennessee Titans did not qualify for the playoffs for the fifth consecutive season.

2014
On January 4, 2014, the Tennessee Titans fired head coach Mike Munchak after two consecutive losing seasons. Head coach Ken Whisenhunt named McCourty the starting cornerback, alongside Coty Sensabaugh, to start the regular season.

He started the Tennessee Titans' season-opener at the Kansas City Chiefs and recorded three solo tackles, two pass deflections, and two interceptions off passes by Alex Smith during their 26-10 victory. In Week 6, McCourty recorded a season-high 11 combined tackles (ten solo) and a pass deflection in the Titans' 16-14 win against the Jacksonville Jaguars. McCourty finished the  season with 85 combined tackles (77 solo), 11 pass deflections, and three interceptions in 16 games and 16 starts.

2015
McCourty suffered a groin injury that sidelined him for the majority of training camp and the entire preseason. His groin injury ultimately caused him to miss the first three games (Weeks 1-3) after requiring surgery that took place on August 24, 2015. Head coach Ken Whisenhunt named Perrish Cox and Coty Sensabaugh the starting cornerbacks to start the regular season in McCourty's place. McCourty was named a co-defensive captain during the 2015 season.

In Week 8, McCourty recorded a season-high seven combined tackles during the Titans' 20-6 loss at the Houston Texans. He aggravated his groin injury during the game and missed the remainder of the season. On November 4, 2015, the Tennessee Titans fired head coach Ken Whisenhunt after a 1-6 start. They promoted tight ends coach Mike Mularkey to interim head coach for the remainder of the season. On November 16, 2015, he was placed on the team's injured reserve with a groin injury that required surgery. He finished the  season with 15 combined tackles (ten solo) in four games and four starts.

2016
Head coach Mike Mularkey named McCourty and Perrish Cox the starting cornerbacks to start the 2016 regular season. In Week 4, he recorded four combined tackles, deflected a pass, and an interception in the Titans' 27-20 loss at the Houston Texans. On October 27, 2016, McCourty collected a season-high 11 combined tackles (eight solo) and two pass deflections in their 36-22 win against the Jacksonville Jaguars. In Week 15, McCourty left the Titans' 19-17 victory at the Kansas City Chiefs in the first quarter after he sustained a chest injury in the first quarter that sidelined him for the last two games (Weeks 16-17) of the season. He finished the  season with 69 combined tackles (60 solo), 12 pass deflections, and two interceptions in 14 games and 14 starts.

2017
On April 13, 2017, the Titans released McCourty after eight seasons with the team, after he rejected a pay cut. The Titans had recently signed free agent cornerback Logan Ryan; they were also considering selecting a cornerback in the upcoming 2017 NFL Draft, which had a deep group of cornerbacks available.

Cleveland Browns
On May 16, 2017, the Cleveland Browns signed McCourty to a two-year, $6 million contract, with a signing bonus of $1.25 million and a total of $2 million guaranteed.

Throughout training camp, he competed for a job as the starting cornerback against Joe Haden, Jamar Taylor, and Briean Boddy-Calhoun. Head coach Hue Jackson named him the starting cornerback, alongside Jamar Taylor, after the Browns released Joe Haden.

In Week 2, McCourty made four combined tackles, two pass deflections, forced a fumble on Alex Collins, and intercepted a pass by Joe Flacco during the Browns' 24-10 loss at the Baltimore Ravens. On October 15, 2017, McCourty made a solo tackle, deflected a pass, and returned an interception by Deshaun Watson for a 56-yard touchdown in a 33-17 loss at the Houston Texans. The interception returned for a touchdown marked McCourty's first touchdown of his career. He missed two consecutive games (Weeks 7-8) after he suffered an ankle injury. On December 10, 2017, he collected a season-high ten combined tackles (eight solo) in their 27-21 loss to the Green Bay Packers. He finished the  season with 69 combined tackles (60 solo), 12 pass deflections, two interceptions, and a touchdown in 14 games and 14 starts.

Despite Jason's efforts, the 2017 Cleveland Browns became the second team in NFL history to finish 0–16 after the 2008 Detroit Lions.

New England Patriots

2018 

On March 15, 2018, the Cleveland Browns traded McCourty to the New England Patriots along with a 2018 seventh-round pick for New England's 2018 sixth-round pick. The trade placed McCourty and his twin brother Devin on the same NFL team for the first time in their careers. Safety Duron Harmon switched his jersey number to 21 so that McCourty could have jersey number 30. McCourty appeared in all 16 regular season games for the Patriots, and started in 12. He finished the 2018 season with 70 combined tackles (54 solo) and 1 interception. McCourty helped the Patriots reach Super Bowl LIII where they beat the Los Angeles Rams 13–3. In the third quarter, with the Patriots leading 3–0, McCourty broke up a pass in the end zone to Rams receiver Brandin Cooks, preventing a touchdown. After the game, Patriots head coach Bill Belichick called the play "huge.”

2019 

On March 13, 2019, McCourty signed a two-year, $10 million contract extension with the Patriots.
In week 5 against the Washington Redskins, McCourty recorded his first interception of the season off Colt McCoy in the 33-7 win.

2020
Jason and his brother Devin were both named Patriots teams captains for the 2020 season.

Miami Dolphins
McCourty signed with the Miami Dolphins on May 7, 2021. He was placed on injured reserve on October 26, 2021.

He retired on July 15, 2022.

NFL career statistics

Regular season

Personal life
McCourty's identical twin brother, Devin McCourty, was a Pro Bowl safety for the New England Patriots for 13 years. They are among only 13 sets of twins in NFL history . They were the first set to play in a Super Bowl together, as well as the first to win one, doing so in Super Bowl LIII.

Jason and Devin McCourty jointly delivered the 2019 commencement address at Rutgers; they also received honorary doctorates from their alma mater.

Jason is married to Melissa McCourty and the couple have three children.

References

External links
 Tennessee Titans bio

1987 births
Living people
20th-century African-American people
21st-century African-American sportspeople
African-American players of American football
American football cornerbacks
American twins
Cleveland Browns players
Ed Block Courage Award recipients
Miami Dolphins players
National Football League announcers
New England Patriots players
Players of American football from New York (state)
People from Nyack, New York
Rutgers Scarlet Knights football players
Saint Joseph Regional High School alumni
Sportspeople from the New York metropolitan area
Tennessee Titans players
Twin sportspeople